The men's team épée competition at the 2018 Asian Games in Jakarta was held on 22 August at the Jakarta Convention Center.

Schedule
All times are Western Indonesia Time (UTC+07:00)

Seeding
The teams were seeded taking into account the results achieved by competitors representing each team in the individual event.

Results

Final standing

References

Results

External links
 Fencing at the 2018 Asian Games - Men's team épée

Men's épée team